Pearl of Csaba (Csabagyöngye in Hungarian) is a white variety of grape. It was created in 1904 by the Hungarian viticulturalist Adolf Stark, presumably by crossing Madeleine Angevine × Muscat Courtillier (= Muscat Précoce de Saumur). Some sources instead state the parent varieties as Bronner x Muscat Ottonel, but this is seen as less likely. The variety's name was taken from the city Békéscsaba, which is also called Csaba for short.

Pearl of Csaba is primarily used as a table grape.

References 

White wine grape varieties
Grape varieties of Hungary